Ranibas may refer to:

Ranibas, Bheri, Nepal
Ranibas, Janakpur, Nepal
Ranibas, Kosi, Nepal
Ranibas, Udayapur, Nepal